The flag of Tierra del Fuego, Antarctica and South Atlantic Islands Province is an Argentinian provincial flag representing Tierra del Fuego Province, Argentina and its constituent parts. The flag was adopted by the provincial government on November 9th, 1999 after it was selected as the winning design in a public contest. It was designed by Teresa Beatríz Martínez.

Design 
The flag of the Tierra del Fuego Province is composed of two roughly triangular fields of orange and blue which are divided by stylized white albatross that stretches from the top hoist to the bottom fly. The blue field features five white, five-pointed stars tilted to the left, representing the Southern Cross constellation. 

The orange color represents the eponymous fire of Tierra del Fuego (English: Land of Fire). The shape of the orange field is a stylized representation of the outline of the Argentine section of the Isla Grande de Tierra del Fuego. The blue represents the sea that surrounds the island, and the sky. The stars represent the surrounding islands and territorial elements that make up the province. The albatross is a bird native to the local fauna, and in the flag, it represents freedom.

Use 

The flag of Tierra del Fuego was adopted to represent the entirety of the provincial region, including the Argentine portion of Isla Grande de Tierra del Fuego, Isla de los Estados, and smaller islands in the region. The province also includes disputed territorial claims of the Argentine Antarctic, South Georgia and the South Sandwich Islands, and the Falkland Islands (Spanish: Islas Malvinas). South Georgia and the South Sandwich Island and the Falkland Island are administered by the United Kingdom which has also granted them each their own flag. (See Flag of South Georgia and the South Sandwich Islands and Flag of the Falkland Islands)

See also 
 Flag of Antarctica
 Flag of Magallanes

References 

Tierra del Fuego Province, Argentina
Tierra del Fuego Province, Argentina
Tierra del Fuego Province, Argentina
Tierra del Fuego Province, Argentina
Tierra del Fuego Province, Argentina
Tierra del Fuego Province, Argentina
Tierra del Fuego Province, Argentina
1999 establishments in Argentina
Flags adopted through competition